David Allan Francis (born January 19, 1973) is an American lawyer and former cyclist.

Biography

Education
Francis graduated from Dixie High School in St. George, Utah, earned a Bachelor of Arts in Political Science from Brigham Young University and a Juris Doctor from California Western School of Law. He was the first in his family to receive a bachelor's or a doctorate degree.

Cycling career
He is a former member of the United States Cycling Team (1989–1991) and was part of the next generation of American cyclists (after the success of Greg LeMond and Andrew Hampsten) to compete in professional cycling, a sport traditionally dominated by Europeans. His teammates included Lance Armstrong, George Hincapie, Bobby Julich and Jonathan Vaughters. He was originally coached by Bob Bills, but in 1990 USA Cycling Team Director Chris Carmichael hired former European professional rider, Rene Wenzel, to replace him. Francis traveled and raced internationally as a member of the United States Cycling Team for three years before leaving the team in 1991 to serve a two-year service mission for the Church of Jesus Christ of Latter-day Saints. Francis feels tremendous pride from representing his country in cycling and credits his time on the US National Cycling Team as a great teacher of personal responsibility, hard work and setting and achieving goals.

Cycling Achievements
1989-1991 US Cycling Team Member (Team USA)
1989 Junior Olympic Festival, Mexico City, Mexico - Gold Medal
1989 Tour of Pontivy, Brittany, France - 2nd Overall
1989 Tour of Pontivy, Individual Time Trial, Brittany, France - 2nd Place
1989 Mammoth Stage Race, Mammoth Lakes, CA - 2nd Overall
1989 U.S. Junior National Championships (Road Race) - 10th Place
1990 Glenwood Springs Professional Road Race, Glenwood Springs, CO - 10th Place
1990 Tour of the Future, Team Time Trial, Bisbee, AZ - 1st Place
1990 U.S. Junior National Championships (Road Race) - 2nd Place
1990 Utah State Time Trial Championships  - 1st Place
2005 Southern Nevada/California Hill Climb Championships - 2nd Place
2006 Southern Nevada/California Hill Climb Championships - 1st Place
2007 LOTOJA Classic, Pro Division - 1st Place (Salt River Pass Record)
2008 LOTOJA Classic, Pro Division - 2nd Place 
2009 High Uintah Classic, Evanston, Wyoming - 1st Place
2009 Sundance Hill Climb - 1st Place (New Record Time)
2009 Big Cottonwood Hill Climb - 1st Place
2009 Snowbird Hill Climb - 1st Place
2009 LOTOJA Classic, Pro Division - 2nd Place 
2010 Intermountain Cup MTB, Jackson Hole Resort Pro Division - 1st Place

Personal life
Born in Salt Lake City and raised in Teton, Idaho his love for the mountains began at an early age. The son of an Australian immigrant, he is a dual citizen of Australia and the United States. Francis is the proud father of 4 boys, Samuel, Ethan, Aidan and Henry. He loves to be close with them and spend time with them. Francis was previously married to Emily Webster.

Legal career
Francis became interested in the law and becoming a lawyer after his older sister, Suzie, was killed in a motor vehicle accident when she was 19. The poor manner in which the insurance company dealt with Francis' family after the loss of Suzie, left an impression on Francis that has stayed with him to this day. After graduating from law school, he accepted a job with Mainor Harris Lawyers, working directly with Richard Harris, one of its founders. After working directly with Harris, Francis later worked for Alverson Taylor and then Beckley Singleton, both large insurance defense firms in Las Vegas. Francis saw his time working for large insurance defense firms as an education into how insurance companies operate and treat victims of injury they are contractually obligated to compensate. While at Beckley Singleton, Francis practiced sports and entertainment law where he worked with The Ultimate Fighting Championship and Dana White directly. He founded the David Francis Law Firm, a civil trial law firm that specialized in personal injury law in Las Vegas, Nevada in 2007. Francis enjoyed success as a top civil litigator and trial attorney in Las Vegas. In 2009 he became the first trial lawyer in Las Vegas to receive a jury award in a medical malpractice case in over 10 years when the jury awarded his client $3.6 million dollars. Francis grew the David Francis Law Firm to over 35 staff and 6 attorneys. He is currently focused on expanding his practice to serve the Salt Lake City community.

Current Activities
As of 2022, Francis resides in Salt Lake City, Utah and is an attorney at Salt Lake City, Utah personal injury law firm, LifeLaw. Francis is also a member of the HEAL non-profit organization that is seeking to reduce the air pollution and "inversion" that plagues Salt Lake City's winter skies.

References

External links

1973 births
Living people
American male cyclists
Latter Day Saints from Nevada
Brigham Young University alumni
California Western School of Law alumni
Nevada lawyers
People from Las Vegas
People from Salt Lake City
21st-century American lawyers